George and Junior are cartoon characters, two anthropomorphic bears created by Tex Avery for Metro-Goldwyn-Mayer. All of the George and Junior shorts were directed by Tex Avery in the 1940s. They appeared in four cartoons: Henpecked Hoboes (1946), Hound Hunters (1947), Red Hot Rangers (1947), and Half-Pint Pygmy (1948).

The cartoons would usually follow the misadventures of two bears inspired by George and Lennie from John Steinbeck's Of Mice and Men: George, the short, short-tempered intelligent one (voiced by Dick Nelson) and Junior, the tall, dim-witted one (voiced by Tex Avery). George would usually come up with a plan to fix their current situation. Junior would accidentally mess it up somehow, then George would get angry and say "Bend over, Junior", and, when Junior does so, George delivers a hard kick to his rear end.

Appearances
The characters' looks and voices were altered for their fourth appearance. Later, they were brought back to life by Pat Ventura on the Hanna-Barbera anthology franchise What a Cartoon! in the 1990s voiced by John Rubinow and Tony Pope, respectively. A gray-purple version of George made a headshot cameo appearance during the final scene of the 1988 film Who Framed Roger Rabbit (the octopus from Half-Pint Pygmy also made a cameo as a bartender at The Ink and Paint Club). Junior was planned to have a cameo in the film, but was later dropped for unknown reasons. They would later make appearances in Dark Horse Comics with Tex Avery's Wolf and Red and Screwy Squirrel.

Lucky Ducky was originally planned to feature George and Junior.

In 2019, both George and Junior make an appearance as zoo catchers in the fourth season of The Tom and Jerry Show episode called "Shadow of a Doubt". They also make various cameos in the series. In the show, George is voiced by Ben Diskin, while Junior is voiced by Stephen Stanton.

Cartoons

Voice actors
 Dick Nelson (1946–1947, George)
 Tex Avery (1946–1948, Junior)
 Wally Maher (Half-Pint Pygmy, George)
 John Rubinow and Tony Pope (What a Cartoon!)
 Ben Diskin and Stephen Stanton (The Tom and Jerry Show)

Comics

List of comics appearances 
 Tex Avery's Screwball Squirrel #1 (plus Wolf and Red) (1995) (Dark Horse Comics)
 Tex Avery's Screwball Squirrel #3 (plus Wolf and Red) (1995) (Dark Horse Comics) (Junior only)
 Comics and Stories #2 Featuring Tex Avery's Screwball Squirrel (1996) (Dark Horse Comics)

Home media
 Henpecked Hoboes is on the DVD of Till the Clouds Roll By
 Hound Hunters is on the DVD of Fiesta (1947)
 Red Hot Rangers is on the DVD of Tycoon (1947)

In 2020, Warner Archive released the cartoons Hound Hunters and Red Hot Rangers uncut and digitally restored as part of the Tex Avery Screwball Classics: Volume 1 Blu-Ray.

See also
Of Fox and Hounds

References

External links
George and Junior at Don Markstein's Toonopedia. 

Tex Avery
Animated film series
MGM cartoon characters
Film characters introduced in 1946
Film series introduced in 1946
Fictional bears
Fictional anthropomorphic characters
Male characters in animation
Animated duos
Comedy film series
Of Mice and Men
Metro-Goldwyn-Mayer cartoon studio film series